Denny Field is located on the campus of the University of Washington in Seattle. It was the home grounds for the university's football team for a quarter-century, from 1895 until 1920.  Washington compiled an overall home record of 87 wins, 15 losses, and 13 ties on the field including an NCAA record 59–0–4 winning streak from 1907 to 1917.

On Saturday, November 6, 1920, the final game at Denny Field was played, a 3–0 loss to Stanford; the only scoring was a drop-kicked field goal in the second quarter.  Three weeks later, the UW Sun Dodgers hosted Dartmouth of New Hampshire in the inaugural game of the venue later known as Husky Stadium; the visitors won 28–7 on November 27.

It is located south of the intersection of NE 45th Street and 20th Avenue NE, by Hutchinson Hall and Hansee Hall.

References

External links
Game program: Washington State at Washington – November 29, 1917

Defunct college football venues
Washington Huskies football venues
Sports venues in Seattle
American football venues in Washington (state)
Demolished sports venues in Washington (state)